Mahabir Pun is a Nepali researcher, teacher, social entrepreneur and an activist known for his work in applying wireless technologies to develop remote areas of the Himalayas, also known as the Nepal Wireless Networking Project. He is a widely known figure in Nepal, and his work has been recognized by the Ashoka Foundation, the Ramon Magsaysay Foundation, University of Nebraska, and Global Ideas Bank. He is a humanitarian whose work is inspiring many youths to return their own country and serve it for its development.

Early life and education 
Mahabir Pun was born on January 22 1955 in Nangi, a remote village in the mountainous Myagdi District of western Nepal. He spent his childhood grazing cattle and sheep and attending a village school without paper, pencils, textbooks or qualified teachers. Traditionally, the local people had no education, and most men joined the British [Gurkha] army. Mahabir Pun's life changed dramatically when his father, a retired Gurkha, took the remarkable step of moving the family to the southern plains of Nepal and investing their entire savings in his son's education. After finishing high school, Pun worked as a teacher for about 12 years in four schools, while supporting his brothers' and sisters' education. In 1989, after numerous applications to UK and US universities, he succeeded in gaining a partial scholarship to the University of Nebraska at Kearney, from which he graduated in 1992 with a bachelor's degree in Science Education. After graduation, he returned to his native village, twenty-four years after having left there as a child. It was in Nangi that he recognized the critical need for sustainable education and began to formulate his goal of creating a high school to serve as a model for local educational and economic development. Pun founded the Himanchal High School with a special focus on computer education and other programs with income-generating capacity. He then returned to the University of Nebraska for a master's degree in Educational Administration, which he completed in 2001.In 2002 the aim of the project is to build a local communications network using wireless technology. The Project helps connect people in remote Himalayan communities with one another as well as the outside world. By 2006, through the Project, Pun was able to establish a Wi-Fi network to connect 13 mountainous villages to the Internet. The Project has now expanded to include over 175 remote villages in 15 districts of Nepal.

Educational and economic development

While in the United States of America, Pun had recognized that information technology had the potential to transform the education system and the economy of his village, and he had taken courses to acquire the skills needed to assemble, refurbish and use computers. On his return to Nepal, he successfully campaigned for the donation of used computers from Japan, Malaysia, Australia, Singapore, and the US, and powered them with two small hydro generators (donated by Singaporean climbers on their way to Mount Everest) installed in a nearby stream. Pun began teaching computer classes to students and fellow teachers, but it proved impossible to establish a telephone connection to the nearest city, Pokhara, and the Internet. Pun e-mailed the BBC, asking for ideas. The BBC publicized his dilemma, and soon volunteers from Europe and the USA responded. In 2001, donors and volunteers helped him to rig a wireless connection between Nangi and the neighboring village of Ramche, using small handmade TV dish antennae mounted in trees. Small grants soon led to the construction of improvised mountaintop relay stations and a link to Pokhara. By 2003, Nangi had a wireless connection to the Internet. Later, Pun brought in more used computers donated from abroad, distributed them to other schools in other villages, and began work to develop a wireless distance-learning project supported by income-generating ventures.

Pun's work on distance learning and online educational services constitutes the first attempt in Nepal to address the scarcity of qualified teachers through technology. He took steps to ensure the success and growth of his projects, by arranging for other teachers to attend a computer training course in Pokhara, starting economic projects to fund students' expenses and teachers' salaries, and by attracting hundreds of international volunteers with wide-ranging skills. He has since built a new cultural centre, and has developed communication links for yak farmers, as well as new ventures to hc international trekking and tour groups. He has, therefore, succeeded not just in creating a self-sustaining educational system, but also a range of new economic and social enterprises to support remote communities.

National Innovation Center (राष्ट्रिय आविष्कार केन्द्र)

Mahabir Pun led the initiative to register a nonprofit organization named "Rashtriya Abiskar Kendra" in 2012, widely termed as National Innovation Center in English. Primary objective to establish the Innovation and invention center according to Mahabir Pun is to foster research and developments for the economic development of the country. Mahabir worked with the government for funding of the project which did not happen and since July 2016, Mahabir is running a crowd funding campaign to fund National Innovation efforts. National Innovation Center crowd funding campaign plans to collect build a 10MW hydropower station, which according to the initiative would sustainably fund its running cost. Mahabir has got social attraction with his donation of land for the National Innovation Center.

International recognition
In 2002, Pun was elected Ashoka Fellow by the Ashoka Foundation, the global association of leading social entrepreneurs. The Foundation noted Pun's contribution to overcoming the geographical isolation of many of the communities in which he works, with a new idea which could be replicated in other geographically isolated areas with few educational or economic opportunities.

In 2004, Pun received the Overall Social Innovations Award from the Global Ideas Bank, aka the Institute for Social Inventions. They said, "Using an inspired mix of solar power, tree-based relay systems, and wireless technology, the project is helping yak farmers stay in touch, families communicate and, with an expansion into distance learning, children to gain the education."

In 2007, Pun was awarded the Magsaysay Award, considered by some to be the Nobel Prize of Asia, in recognition of "his innovative application of wireless computer technology in Nepal, bringing progress to remote mountain areas by connecting his village to the global village".  Pun is one of five Nepalis to receive the Magsaysay Award, and the only one to receive the Magsaysay Award for Community Leadership.

Later in 2007, the University of Nebraska awarded Pun an honorary degree as Doctor of Humane Letters for his outstanding work for his country, Nepal.

Mahabir Pun was inducted in Internet Hall of Fame in 2014.

In 2014 Pun was awarded the Jonathan B. Postel Service Award by the Internet Society.

In 2021 Pun announced a TV Show Aaviskar on Nepal's first 4K TV channel Galaxy 4K.

References

External links
List of articles and published materials about his work

Living people
People from Myagdi District
Nepalese educators
University of Nebraska alumni
Ramon Magsaysay Award winners
1955 births
20th-century Nepalese educators
21st-century Nepalese educators